Hays Camp Aerodrome  is a privately owned ice runway located on Sandspit Lake, Nunavut, Canada. The aerodrome, which is open from January to April, services the related explorations for gold as part of the Three Bluffs Gold Project.

References

Airports in the Arctic
Registered aerodromes in the Kivalliq Region